Berum may refer to:

 A district in the German municipality of Berumbur
 A village in the German municipality of Hage
 Berum Castle, a castle in that village
 Treaty of Berum, a treaty signed at that castle.